The 1970–71 Libyan Premier League was the 7th edition of the competition since its inception in 1963.

Overview
It was contested by 14 teams, and Al-Ahly Tripoli won the championship.

League standings

References

Libya - List of final tables (RSSSF)

Libyan Premier League seasons
Libya
Premier League